33Across is a publisher monetization company, founded in 2008 by CEO Eric Wheeler. The 33Across platform delivers programmatic video and display ad revenue to publishers across devices. Headquartered in Sunnyvale, California, the platform connects buyers and sellers through attention-focused ad formats and has offices and employees in New York, Chicago, Los Angeles, the UK, India, and Japan.

History 
33Across was among the first companies to leverage social data to build predictive targeting for brands. The company grew quickly with Series A venture backing from First Round Capital. Flybridge provided Series B, providing the capital to acquire San Franciscobased Tynt, a sharing technology on about 800,000 websites in over 195 countries that reaches 1 billion global users monthly. After heavy revenue losses in 2012 and plateauing in 2013, the company downsized and began to build a new business focused on securing quality in-view ad impressions.

In 2014, 33Across signed its one millionth publisher. In 2017, the company promoted Yuri Burka to managing director of the EU and Shyam Kuttikad to CTO. After four years of triple-digit growth, in 2018, the company expanded to Europe and Asia. 33Across marked its strongest year in its 14-year history with EBITDA growth of 500% from 2019 to 2020. In 2021, Paul Bell was appointed as president.

In 2021, the company launched Lexicon; an identity solution created specifically to help publishers succeed without cookies. In June, 2022, it was announced that Lexicon saw 15X year-over-year growth in daily cookieless revenue for publishers as well as 300% increase in fill rates and 150% increase in cookieless CPMs.

Today, 33Across has over 800,000 integrated global publishers, over 1 billion global users, and over 500 billion in monthly traffic.

Corporate affairs 

33Across is managed by CEO Eric Wheeler. Other key executives are:

 Paul Bell, President
 Shyam Kuttikkad, Chief Technology Officer
 Amey Bordikar, Senior Vice President of Engineering
 Matt Meyer, General Manager, Platform

References 

Advertising agencies based in New York City
Advertising agencies of the United States
Companies based in Sunnyvale, California
American companies established in 2008
Business services companies established in 2008
Technology companies based in the San Francisco Bay Area
Technology companies based in New York City